Patrik Alexander Sundström (born March 14, 1987) is a Swedish-Canadian hockey coach and former player. He  played for IF Björklöven, Brynäs IF, Mora IK in the Swedish Allsvenskan.

Born in Vancouver, British Columbia, Sundström was drafted by the New Jersey Devils in the seventh round, 218th overall, in the 2005 draft from IF Björklöven.  His father is former NHLer Patrik Sundström who played for the Vancouver Canucks and New Jersey Devils.

Career statistics

Regular season and playoffs

International

References

External links

1987 births
Brynäs IF players
Canadian expatriate ice hockey players in Sweden
Canadian ice hockey centres
Canadian people of Swedish descent
Ice hockey people from Vancouver
Living people
New Jersey Devils draft picks
IF Björklöven players
Swedish ice hockey players